Hume Blake Cronyn (August 28, 1864June 19, 1933) was a Canadian politician and lawyer.

Biography 
Born in London, Canada West, the son of Verschoyle Cronyn (who was the son of Benjamin Cronyn) and Sophia Eliza Blake (who was  the daughter of William Hume Blake), Cronyn was educated at Dr. Tassie's grammar school in Galt, Ontario and at the University of Toronto where he received a Bachelor of Arts degree and a Bachelor of Law degree in 1889. He was called to the Ontario bar in 1889 and practised law in London. In 1907 he was appointed general manager of The Huron and Erie Mortgage Corporation. He was also a General Manager of the Canada Trust Company and a Director of the Mutual Life Assurance Company of Canada.

While at the University of Toronto he enlisted in The Queen's Own Rifles of Canada and served during the North-West Rebellion of 1885 and fought in the Battle of Cut Knife. Afterwards he joined the 7th Fusiliers, and served as Major from 1899 to 1907.

He was elected to the House of Commons as a Unionist in the riding of London in the 1917 election.

An Anglican, he married Frances Amelia Labatt, second daughter of John Labatt, in 1892. He had three sons and two daughters, including Hume Cronyn the actor.

Asteroid (12050) Humecronyn is named in his honour.

The Hume Cronyn Memorial Observatory at The University of Western Ontario was built in his memory by his widow Frances Amelia Cronyn (née Labatt).

References

External links
 Hume Cronyn - Dictionary of Canadian Biography

1864 births
1933 deaths
Queen's Own Rifles of Canada soldiers
Canadian Militia officers
Canadian people of Anglo-Irish descent
Members of the House of Commons of Canada from Ontario
Lawyers in Ontario
Politicians from London, Ontario
University of Toronto alumni
Unionist Party (Canada) MPs